Lasse & Geir is a 1976 Norwegian feature film written and directed by Svend Wam and Petter Vennerød.

Cast 
 Torgeir Schjerven as Lasse 
 Lasse Tømte as Geir 
 Kjersti Døvigen as Kjersti
 Jorunn Kjellsby as Lasse's mother
 Knut Pettersen as Lasse's father

External links

Norwegian crime drama films
Films directed by Svend Wam
Films directed by Petter Vennerød
1976 films
Films set in Oslo